Cholla may refer to:

Geography
 Jeolla Province (Chŏlla), a former Korean province
 North Jeolla Province (North Jeolla), province in the southwest of South Korea
 South Jeolla Province (South Jeolla), province in the southwest of South Korea
Cholla Power Plant, Arizona

Animals and plants
Cholla (horse), a painting horse born in Nevada
Cylindropuntia (cholla cacti), a genus of cylindrical-stemmed cacti

Food
 Cholla or Challah, a type of bread of Jewish origin